Bill Ivy is a British Grand Prix motorcycle road racer.

Bill or William Ivy may also refer to:

Bill Ivy (photographer/author), Canadian photographer/author
'Wild' Bill Ivy, fictional boxer in Greatest Heavyweights
Bill Ivy of 1946 Northwestern Wildcats football team and 1946 All-Big Nine Conference football team
William Ivy (balloonist), later known as Ivy Baldwin

See also
 Bill Ivey, seventh chairman of the National Endowment for the Arts
William Ive (disambiguation)